Afa Amituana'i "Arthur" Anoa'i (born November 21, 1942) is a Samoan-American retired professional wrestler and professional wrestling manager. Since retiring, he has operated the World Xtreme Wrestling promotion and trained wrestlers at the Wild Samoan Training Center.

Early life 
Anoa'i was born on an island in Western Samoa, a trust territory that was then administered by New Zealand, and his family relocated to San Francisco, California in the United States when he was young. At the age of 17, Anoa'i enlisted in the United States Naval Sea Cadet Corps.

Professional wrestling career 
Upon leaving the Naval Sea Cadet Corps, Anoa'i began training as a wrestler under family friends Rocky Johnson and Peter Maivia. He later received supplementary training from Kurt Von Steiger. He wrestled his first match in 1971 in Phoenix, Arizona. He then trained his brother Sika, and the siblings formed a tag team known best as The Wild Samoans.

Throughout the 1970s, The Wild Samoans wrestled for the Canadian Stampede Wrestling promotion (where they received further training from Stu Hart) and for numerous National Wrestling Alliance affiliates. In 1978, The Wild Samoans traveled to Japan to wrestle for the International Wrestling Alliance, winning the IWA Tag Team Championship.

World Wrestling Federation (1979–1980, 1983–1984, 1992–1995)
In 1979, The Wild Samoans joined the World Wrestling Federation, where they were managed by Lou Albano and referred to as "Albano's Wildmen". The "wild" nature of the brothers was conveyed through their unorthodox behavior (which included communicating only in unintelligible grunts and consuming unprepared raw fish, during interviews and while approaching the ring). While in the WWF, The Wild Samoans won the WWF World Tag Team Championship. Both members also challenged Bob Backlund for the WWF Heavyweight Championship on several occasions. They left the promotion in 1980.

The Wild Samoans then wrestled in Mid-South Wrestling and Jim Crockett Promotions, before returning to the WWF (renamed from WWWF in 1979) in 1983 and regaining the WWF World Tag Team Championship. After Sika suffered an injury, the tag team was supplemented by Afa's son Samu (the relationship was not acknowledged on TV). The trio remained in the WWF until 1984. According to Afa, he lost his job because a few days earlier, Afa didn't come to work because he was at the birth of his son. Afa Anoa'i returned to the WWF for a third time in 1992, as the manager and occasional tag partner of The Headshrinkers (Samu and Anoai's nephew, Fatu). He wrestled his final match on May 22, 1994, teaming with The Headshrinkers to defeat The Quebecers and Johnny Polo at the Rosemont Horizon. When Samu left WWF in 1994, he also managed Sionne. Anoa'i left the WWF in mid-1995.

Late career
After leaving the WWF, he began training wrestlers at his Wild Samoan Training Facility, along with Sika. On March 31, 2007, the Wild Samoans were inducted into the WWE Hall of Fame by Samu and Sika's son, Matt. He was the wrestling trainer for Darren Aronofsky's 2008 film, The Wrestler.

In 2013 and 2014, Afa came out of retirement to wrestle for his promotion World Xtreme Wrestling at age 71.

The Wild Samoans appeared at Hell in a Cell (2020) to celebrate Roman Reigns' victory.

Other work
In 1999, Afa and Lynn Anoa'i started the Usos Foundation, a non-profit organization aiming to turn youth away from drugs, gangs and poverty by providing scholarships to the Wild Samoans Training Center.

Championships and accomplishments
Big Time Wrestling
NWA World Tag Team Championship (Detroit version) (2 times) – with Sika
World Wrestling Council
WWC North American Tag Team Championship (1 time) – with Sika 
Continental Wrestling Association
AWA Southern Tag Team Championship (1 time) – with Sika
Georgia Championship Wrestling
NWA National Tag Team Championship (1 time) – with Sika
Gulf Coast Championship Wrestling
NWA Gulf Coast Tag Team Championship (2 times) – with Sika
International Wrestling Alliance
IWA Tag Team Championship (1 time) – with Sika
Mid-South Wrestling Association
Mid-South Tag Team Championship (3 times) – with Sika
NWA All-Star Wrestling
NWA Canadian Tag Team Championship (Vancouver version) (1 time) – with Sika
NWA Mid-America
NWA United States Tag Team Championship (Mid-America version) (1 time)  – with Sika
Professional Wrestling Hall of Fame
Class of 2012 – Inducted as a member of the Wild Samoans
Pro Wrestling Illustrated
PWI ranked him #346 of the top 500 singles wrestlers of the "PWI Years" in 2003
Southeastern Championship Wrestling
NWA Southern Tag Team Championship (Southern Division) (2 times) – with Sika
Stampede Wrestling
Stampede Wrestling International Tag Team Championship (2 times) – with Sika
World Wrestling Entertainment / World Wrestling Federation
WWF Tag Team Championship (3 times) – with Sika
WWE Hall of Fame (Class of 2007)

Acting career
Body Slam (1987)
Miami Vice (1987) in the episode "By Hooker by Crook" as "Henchman #2"
Mr. Nanny (1993)

See also
 Anoa'i family
 The Wild Samoans
 World Xtreme Wrestling

References

http://www.wswrestlingschool.com/

External links
 
 
 
 

1942 births
Samoan male film actors
Samoan professional wrestlers
American male professional wrestlers
American male film actors
American professional wrestlers of Samoan descent
Samoan emigrants to the United States
Anoa'i family
Professional wrestling managers and valets
Professional wrestling trainers
Professional Wrestling Hall of Fame and Museum
WWE Hall of Fame inductees
Living people
Professional wrestling promoters
People from Lake County, Florida
Stampede Wrestling alumni
20th-century professional wrestlers
Stampede Wrestling International Tag Team Champions
NWA National Tag Team Champions